Qushkhaneh may refer to:
 Qushkhaneh-ye Olya, West Azerbaijan Province
 Qushkhaneh District, in North Khorasan Province
 Qushkhaneh-ye Bala Rural District, in North Khorasan Province
 Qushkhaneh-ye Pain Rural District, in North Khorasan Province